This list contains the top 50 accounts with the largest number of followers on the Chinese social media platform TikTok, which was merged with musical.ly in 2018. The most-followed individual on the platform is Khaby Lame, with over 153 million followers. He surpassed the previous most-followed account, Charli D'Amelio, on 22 June 2022.

Most-followed accounts 
The following table lists the 50 most-followed accounts on TikTok, with each follower total rounded down to the nearest hundred thousand, as well as a description of each account and their country of origin.

Historical most-followed accounts 

The following table lists the accounts that were once the most-followed on TikTok, excluding the official TikTok account.

Before Khaby Lame claimed his number one spot on 22 June 2022, Charli D'Amelio was the most-followed TikTok user. She herself claimed the spot from Loren Gray on 25 March 2020 by amassing 41.4 million followers. Later that same year D'Amelio became the first TikTok user to reach 100 million followers.

Before Loren Gray, Lisa and Lena were the most followed individuals on TikTok, with over 32.7 million followers. They deleted their account in March 2019, citing privacy concerns and their loss of interest in the platform. They rejoined TikTok on a new account with the same username on 7 May 2020.

Most-followed accounts on Douyin 
The following table lists the 20 most-followed accounts on Douyin . Douyin, available only in China, is similar to TikTok. However, it runs on separate servers to comply with Chinese censorship restrictions. They are both owned by ByteDance.

See also 
 List of most-liked TikTok videos
 List of most-followed Facebook pages
 List of most-followed Instagram accounts
 List of most-liked Instagram posts
 List of most-followed Twitch channels
 List of most-followed Twitter accounts
 List of most-subscribed YouTube channels
 List of most-subscribed YouTube Music artists

References 

21st century-related lists
Lists of Internet-related superlatives

Tiktok